Archibald Douglas, 5th Earl of Angus (c. 1449October 1513), was a Scottish nobleman, peer, politician, and magnate. Tradition has accorded him the nickname Archibald 'Bell-the-Cat' due to his association with the 1482 rebellion against James III of Scotland. He became one of the most powerful nobleman in Scotland through his influential position on the Scottish Marches, and a willingness to be involved in multiple rebellions in the reigns of James III and James IV of Scotland.

Parents and succession
Archibald Douglas, eldest son of George Douglas, 4th Earl of Angus, head of the Red Douglas line, was born at Tantallon Castle, East Lothian, around 1449. His mother was Isabella Sibbald, daughter of the Master of the Household of James II of Scotland.

During the turbulent 1450s, when Archibald was growing up, his father came out in support of James II, thereby pitching himself against many of his own clan, and the Black Douglas line in particular, who were in rebellion against the king. He was also at the siege of Roxburgh in 1460. After the accidental death of the king during the siege, it was the earl, Archibald's father, who is said to have placed the crown on the new child king's head, reputedly declaring as he did so: "There! Now that I have set it upon your Grace's head, let me see who will be so bold as to move it."

Archibald succeeded his father as fifth Earl of Angus about two years later, in 1462 or 1463, aged fourteen.

Actions against James III
In 1481, during a time of gathering war with England, Angus was appointed Warden of the East March by James III, but the following year took part in the surprise action against the king carried out by a league of Scottish nobles at Lauder on 22 July, 1482. This was at a moment when English forces had just invaded Scotland and the secretly disaffected nobles were ostensibly part of the army that James had mustered to repel the invasion. According to David Hume of Godscroft, writing in a later age, it was here that Archibald earned his nickname by offering to "bell the cat", initiating the action against the king's favourite, Thomas (or Robert) Cochrane, as a prelude to the arrest of the king. 

Angus is said to have begun the attack by seizing the gold chain from Cochrane's neck, then ordering him and others of the king's favourites to be hung from Lauder Bridge (Lauder Brig in Scots), located today in the grounds of Thirlestane Castle. The phrase "to bell the cat" comes from the fable "The Mice in Council", misattributed to Aesop, and refers to a dangerous task undertaken for the benefit of all.

Angus subsequently joined the party of the king's disaffected younger brother, Alexander Stewart, Duke of Albany, who was part of the English invasion. Albany had entered into a treaty with Edward IV which gifted suzerainty over Scotland to the English king in return for the right to rule Scotland in place of his brother. While James was in captivity in Edinburgh, Albany did indeed make a short-lived attempt to rule under the name of "Alexander IV". Eventually, however, by March 1483, both Albany and Angus returned to their allegiance to James who, despite the treasonous alliance with Edward, granted them pardons.

Later in that same decade a more open state of rebellion broke out against the king, this time with greater support of the Scottish nobility, with the king's eldest son, James, Duke of Rothesay, counted among their ranks (although not as leader). Angus once again came out against the king. In 1488, he marched against James III at the Battle of Sauchieburn, in the immediate aftermath of which the defeated king was secretly murdered.

Reign of James IV
After Sauchieburn, Angus became for a time one of the guardians of the young king James IV, but soon lost influence to the Homes and Hepburns, and the wardenship of the marches went to Alexander Home. Although outwardly on good terms with James, Angus treacherously made a treaty with Henry VII around 1489 or 1491, by which he undertook to govern his relations with James according to instructions from England. He also agreed to hand over Hermitage Castle, commanding the pass through Liddesdale into Scotland, on the condition of receiving English estates in compensation.

In October 1491 he fortified his castle of Tantallon against James, but had to submit and to exchange his Liddesdale estate and Hermitage Castle for the lordship of Bothwell.

In 1493 Angus again returned to favour, receiving various grants of lands. He became Chancellor, which office he retained till 1498. In June 1497 he opened talks for the surrender of Perkin Warbeck at 'Jenyn Haugh'. In 1501, in disgrace once more, he was confined to Dumbarton Castle.

Final weeks
Angus's two eldest sons were killed at the Battle of Flodden in early September 1513. He himself had not been present at the battle. As the Scottish nation was coming to terms with the disastrous defeat, Angus won appointment as one of the councilors of the Queen Regent, Margaret Tudor. Shortly afterwards, by the end of October, he too was dead. His successor to the Earldom of Angus was his grandson, Archibald Douglas, 6th Earl of Angus.

Marriages and children
Angus married twice:

 On 4 March 1468: Elizabeth (d. 1498), daughter of Robert Boyd, 1st Lord Boyd
 In the summer of 1500: Katherine Stirling, daughter of Sir William Stirling of Keir

Janet, daughter of John Kennedy, 2nd Lord Kennedy, was one of his mistresses.

Children by first marriage

Notes

References

 Fraser, Sir William, The Douglas Book IV vols. Edinburgh. 1885

1449 births
1513 deaths
15th-century Scottish peers
16th-century Scottish peers
Earls of Angus
Archibald Douglas, 5th Earl of Angus
Lord chancellors of Scotland
Members of the Privy Council of Scotland
Court of James IV of Scotland
Lord High Admirals of Scotland
Burials at Whithorn Priory
15th-century Scottish military personnel
16th-century Scottish military personnel

Year of birth uncertain